The 19 municipalities of the Brussels-Capital Region are the political subdivisions of Belgium's central region. The government of each municipality is responsible for the handling of local level duties, such as law enforcement and the upkeep of schools and roads within its borders. Municipal administration is also conducted by a mayor, a council, and an executive.

In 1831, Belgium was divided into 2,739 municipalities, including 20 within the current Brussels-Capital Region (which at that time did not exist). In 1841, a 21st and 22nd municipality were created when Berchem-Sainte-Agathe formally separated from neighboring Koekelberg and Jette-Ganshoren split into Jette and Ganshoren. Since then, three municipalities have been merged with the City of Brussels: Laeken, Haren, and Neder-Over-Heembeek, in 1921. Unlike most of the municipalities in Belgium, the ones located in the Brussels-Capital Region were not merged with others during mergers occurring in 1964, 1970, and 1975. However, many territorial changes have occurred, predominantly between the City of Brussels and its neighbouring municipalities.

The largest and most populous of the municipalities is the City of Brussels, covering  with 176,545 inhabitants. The least populous is Koekelberg with 21,609 inhabitants, and the smallest in area is Saint-Josse-ten-Noode, which is only  and also has the highest population density of the 19 with 24,650 inhabitants per km2. Watermael-Boitsfort has the lowest population density, at 1,928 per km2.

List
The names of the municipalities are given in the two official languages of the Brussels-Capital Region: French and Dutch.

* —

See also 

 List of municipalities of Belgium
 Municipalities with language facilities

References

External links 

Brussels-Capital Region. Centre d'Informatique pour la Région Bruxelloise (Brussels Regional Informatics Center)
Interactive map of the 19 Communes (Municipalities) of Brussels

Brussels-Capital Region